At the 2008 Summer Olympics, three gymnastics disciplines were contested: artistic gymnastics, rhythmic gymnastics and trampoline.  The artistic gymnastics events were held at the Beijing National Indoor Stadium on August 9–19.  The rhythmic gymnastics events were held at the Beijing University of Technology Gymnasium on August 21–24.  The trampoline events were also held at the Beijing National Indoor Stadium on August 16–19.

Competition schedule
All times are China Standard Time (UTC+8)

Artistic gymnastics

Rhythmic gymnastics

Medal summary

Artistic gymnastics

Men's events

Women's events

Rhythmic gymnastics

Trampoline

Medal table

Qualification

Champions Gala
The traditional Gymnastics Champions Gala took place on August 20 at the National Indoor Stadium. Participants are mainly selected from the 2008 Olympic trampoline and artistic gymnastics, as well as medalists from world championships. In addition, some Chinese pop stars appeared in the Gala.

The performances included Olympic disciplines such as floor exercise, pommel horse, rings, parallel bars, horizontal bar, uneven bars, balance beam, rhythmic gymnastics and trampoline gymnastics; non-Olympic discipline such as tumbling and acrobatic; and art performances such as dancing, martial art, instrument performance and chorus.

Age controversies

China 

On August 21, 2008 the IOC instructed the International Gymnastics Federation (FIG) to investigate allegations that Chinese gymnast He Kexin was underaged and therefore ineligible to compete during the Olympic gymnastics competition.  The FIG requires that all gymnasts be at least 16 years of age in the Olympic calendar year. The IOC had initially accepted the ages of all the Chinese participants, but newly uncovered documents suggested He was 14 years old, and thus ineligible to compete.

The investigation was initiated after an American blogger reported on a cached official Excel spreadsheet showing He's birthday as January 1, 1994.  His discoveries support earlier reports from The New York Times and other bloggers regarding He's age discrepancy. Earlier, several bloggers found links to news stories and photo captions from 2007 and early 2008, including stories in the state-run Xinhua news service, that cited He's age as 13.

On October 1, 2008, the FIG ended their investigation and concluded that He and her teammates from the 2008 Olympic games were old enough to compete.  This ruling confirmed the FIG's initial conclusions.  Though some media outlets have voiced doubts about the decision, the gymnasts have been cleared by the FIG of any wrongdoing.

North Korea 

In 2014, North Korean female gymnast Cha Yong-hwa was a subject of disciplinary hearing because of false passport used to falsify her age. The FIG decided to withdraw her license and nullify all her results, including the results from 2008 Olympics.

See also

 Concerns and controversies at the 2008 Summer Olympics
 Gymnastics at the 2006 Asian Games
 Gymnastics at the 2006 Commonwealth Games
 Gymnastics at the 2007 Pan American Games
 2007 World Artistic Gymnastics Championships
 Underage Gymnasts Controversy at 2008 Summer Olympics

References

External links

 Beijing 2008 Summer Olympics
 Federation Internationale de Gymnastique
 Artistic Gymnastics – Official Results Book
 Rhythmic Gymnastics – Official Results Book
 Trampoline Gymnastics – Official Results Book
 
 
 

 
2008 Summer Olympics events
2008
Olympics 2008
2008 in gymnastics